The House at 29 Mt. Vernon Street in Somerville, Massachusetts is a well-preserved Greek Revival cottage.  The -story wood-frame house was built in the late 1840s, when Mt. Vernon Street was a site of significant development activity.  The house is distinctive on the street, as most of the other houses are larger.  This house features wide eaves, and a full pedimented gable end above a porch with Ionic columns. It has an elaborate front door surrounded, with framed paneling and pilasters.

The house was listed on the National Register of Historic Places in 1989.

See also
Mount Vernon Street Historic District, a cluster of c. 1850 Greek Revival cottages
National Register of Historic Places listings in Somerville, Massachusetts

References

Houses on the National Register of Historic Places in Somerville, Massachusetts